Bryum elegans is a species of mosses in the family Bryaceae. It is found in Norway, Poland, and the Russian Federation.

Taxonomy

Synonyms
 Bryum elegans Grev., 1828, a synonym for Bryum pallens fo. speciosum (Voit) Podp.
 Bryum elegans Nees, 1827, a synonym for Bryum capillare Hedw. var. capillare

Gallery

References

External links

Bryum elegans at The Plant List
Bryum elegans at Tropicos

elegans
Plants described in 1828
Flora of Norway
Flora of Poland
Flora of Russia